is an autobahn spur north of Hanover in northwestern Germany. It is an important bypass for traffic from the A 7 to the A 2, avoiding the Hannover-Ost ("East") interchange between the two autobahns. Hannover Airport is also situated near the A 352, which is why locals occasionally refer to it as the Flughafenautobahn ("airport autobahn").

Exit list 

 (northern part)
 (southern part) 

|}

External links 

352
A352